Écouen – Ézanville is a railway station in Ézanville (Val d'Oise department), France.  It is on the Épinay-Villetaneuse–Le Tréport-Mers railway, which connects the Paris agglomeration with the coastal resort Le Tréport via Beauvais. The station is served by Transilien suburban trains from the Gare du Nord in Paris to Persan-Beaumont and to Luzarches. The daily number of passengers lied between 2,500 and 7,500 in 2002. The station has 300 parking spaces. The line from Épinay-Villetaneuse to Persan-Beaumont via Montsoult was opened by the Compagnie des chemins de fer du Nord (Nord Railway Company) in 1877.

Bus routes

RATP 269
Valmy: 13

References

External links
 

Railway stations in Val-d'Oise
Railway stations in France opened in 1877